Labeo dussumieri (Malabar Labeo) is fish in genus Labeo known to occur in west-flowing rivers of the Western Ghats. Earlier Sri Lankan population was considered as the same species as L. dussumieri, recent phylogenetic and physiological differences suggest that Sri Lankan population is a distinct species, Labeo heladiva..

Named in honor of Jean-Jacques Dussumier (1792-1883), French voyager and merchant, whose account of this species is the basis of Valenciennes’ description.

References 

 

Labeo
Taxa named by Achille Valenciennes
Fish described in 1842